Mielenrauhaa is the debut solo studio album by Finnish singer-songwriter Aki Sirkesalo. Released by Sony Music Entertainment in January 1995, the album peaked at number five on the Finnish Albums Chart and spawned some of his best-known songs, such as "Naispaholainen", "Hikinen iltapäivä" and "Pelkkää kuvitelmaa", a Finnish-language cover version of The Temptations song "Just My Imagination (Running Away with Me)". The latter was also released as a single and peaked at number nine on the Finnish Singles Chart.

Reception
Sirkesalo received an Emma Award for the Best Album in 1995. According to IFPI Finland, Mielenrauhaa earned Sirkesalo a gold record in 1995 and went on to sell platinum by 1999.

Track listing

Chart performance

References

1995 debut albums
Aki Sirkesalo albums
Pop rock albums by Finnish artists
Sony Music albums